Pascal "Pat" Pompey Pirone (October 7, 1907 Mount Vernon, New York – January 11, 2003, Lexington, Kentucky) was a botanist, plant pathologist, urban horticulturalist, science communicator, and author.

Biography
He grew up in Mount Vernon, New York. After graduating from A. B. Davis High School (now Mount Vernon High School), he matriculated in 1925 at Cornell University. There he was a member of the 1927 intercollegiate championship fencing team and the captain of the fencing team in his graduation year of 1929.

In 1933 he graduated from Cornell University with a Ph.D. in plant pathology. His doctoral dissertation has the title "Studies on the Leaf-blight of Carrots Caused by Macrosporium carotae Ell. & Lang." (Macrosporium carotae is a synonym for Alternaria carotae.) From 1933 to 1934 he worked for the U.S. Department of Agriculture in the Dutch elm disease eradication program. He was from 1934 to 1938 an assistant professor of plant pathology at Cornell University and from 1938 to 1947 an associate professor at Rutgers University. From 1947 until his retirement in 1974, he was a horticulturist and plant pathologist in charge of disease and insect control at the New York Botanical Garden (NYBG). He became the NYBG's Director of Education and taught adult education courses there. He was a frequent guest on radio programs such as The Garden Hot Line. (The Garden Hot Line was a weekly WOR (AM) radio show hosted by Ralph Snodsmith for 35 years.)

In the early years of his NYBG employment, Pirone conducted tests of pesticides to eradicate the Botryosphaeria ribis canker disease of London planetrees in New York City.

During WW II he was in charge of New Jersey's Victory Garden program.

Pirone worked as a consultant for the New York City Department of Parks and Recreation, the Triborough Bridge Authority, Sleepy Hollow Restorations, country clubs, commercial florists, and many corporations, including General Motors, IBM, shipping lines, and public utilities companies.

He and his wife Loretta, who died in 1987, had three sons and a daughter. Thomas P. Pirone, one of the three sons, became a professor of plant pathology at the University of Kentucky. Albert Parella, known as the "Dahlia King of the Bronx", was a friend of the Pirone family and gave the names "Dr. P. P. Pirone" and "Loretta Pirone" to two varieties of dahlia.

Fonds
The Mertz Library of the New York Botanical Garden has the Pascal P. Pirone fonds consisting of "correspondence, research papers, manuscripts, photographic material, artwork, reprints, and an audio recording." There are 16 files of general correspondence with correspondents, including Charles Barney Harding (stockbroker associated with Smith Barney & Co.), Howard S. Irwin, Ronald Lauder, Thomas P. Reilly (nurseryman who introduced "Ra-Pid-Gro Plant Food" in 1938 in Woolworth five-and-dime stores), and William J. Robbins.

Awards and honors
 1975 — Fellow of the American Phytopathogical Society
 1980 — Award of Merit of the International Society of Arboriculture
 1982 — Gold Medal of Horticulture of the New York State Nurseryman's Association

Eponyms
 Nectriella pironii

Selected publications
  2nd edition 1948.
  (title changed from 2nd edition); 4th edition 1972; 5th edition 1978; 6th edition 1989 with Pascal Pirone as co-author.
  (This is a revision of the 6th edition with most of the revision written by John Hartman.)
 
 
 with Bernard Ogilvie Dodge and Harold William Rickett:  4th edition 1970 by Pirone and Dodge; 5th edition 1978 by Pirone.
 with Michael Rapuano and Brooks E. Wigginton:

References

1907 births
2003 deaths
20th-century American botanists
21st-century American botanists
American people of Italian descent
Arborists
American horticulturists
Cornell University alumni
Cornell University faculty
Rutgers University faculty
New York Botanical Garden
People from Mount Vernon, New York